Alzarri Shaheim Joseph (born 20 November 1996) is an Antiguan cricketer who plays for the West Indies in Tests and ODIs. He plays for Leeward Islands and the St Kitts and Nevis Patriots in West Indian domestic cricket. He is an all-rounder who is a right-arm fast bowler and a right handed batsman who was selected by the Mumbai Indians franchise as a replacement for Adam Milne for the 2019 Indian Premier League (IPL) season. In 2016, Joseph was named Antigua and Barbuda Sportsman of the Year award.

Domestic career
A West Indies under-19s player, Joseph made his first-class debut for the Leewards during the 2014–15 Regional Four Day Competition. Against Guyana during the following season, he took a maiden first-class five-wicket haul, 5/99 opening the bowling with Gavin Tonge. The following match, against the Windward Islands, he took another five-wicket haul, 7/46.

In December 2015, Joseph was named in the West Indies squad for the 2016 Under-19 World Cup. At the tournament, he took 13 wickets from six matches to finish as his team's leading wicket-taker (and equal third overall). His best performance was 4/30 against Zimbabwe, which saw him named man of the match.

In October 2019, he was named in the Leeward Islands' squad for the 2019–20 Regional Super50 tournament.

International career
In July 2016 he was added to the West Indies Test squad for their series against India. He made his Test debut on 9 August 2016 in the third match of the series. He made his One Day International (ODI) debut for the West Indies against Pakistan on 2 October 2016.

In October 2018, Cricket West Indies (CWI) awarded him a contract across all formats of cricket for the 2018–19 season.

He received plaudits when, during the 2nd Test match against England in early 2019, Joseph carried on playing, in spite of the news after the 2nd day's play that his mother had died.

In June 2020, Joseph was named in the West Indies' Test squad, for their series against England. The Test series was originally scheduled to start in May 2020, but was moved back to July 2020 due to the COVID-19 pandemic.

Joseph scored his maiden Test fifty on 5 December 2020, scoring 86 runs in the second innings of a big loss against New Zealand.

In June 2022, Joseph was named in the West Indies' Twenty20 International (T20I) squad for their series against Bangladesh. The following month, he was also named in the West Indies' T20I squad, this time for their series against India. He made his T20I debut on 29 July 2022, for the West Indies against India.

T20 career
In March 2019, Joseph was selected for the Mumbai Indians as a replacement for Adam Milne in the Indian Premier League (IPL). On 6 April 2019, he made his IPL debut against the Sunrisers Hyderabad and took the figures of 6/12, the best bowling figures for a debutant, beating Andrew Tye's 5/17 in 2017. These were also the best bowling figures in the IPL, breaking the eleven-year-old record held by Sohail Tanvir (6/14) and the second best T20 bowling figures after Deepak Chahar (6/7). He also became only the second player to take a five-wicket haul on IPL debut, after Andrew Tye. His bowling figures remain the best in a T20 at the Rajiv Gandhi Stadium.

In July 2019, he was selected to play for the Amsterdam Knights in the inaugural edition of the Euro T20 Slam cricket tournament. However, the following month the tournament was cancelled. He was released by the Mumbai Indians ahead of the 2020 IPL auction. In July 2020, he was named in the St Kitts & Nevis Patriots squad for the 2020 Caribbean Premier League. He went unsold in the 2021 IPL auction. In February 2022, he was bought by the Gujarat Titans in the auction for the 2022 Indian Premier League tournament.

References

External links

1996 births
Living people
West Indies Test cricketers
West Indies One Day International cricketers
West Indies Twenty20 International cricketers
Antigua and Barbuda cricketers
Leeward Islands cricketers
St Kitts and Nevis Patriots cricketers
West Indies under-19 cricketers
Mumbai Indians cricketers
Worcestershire cricketers
Gujarat Titans cricketers